The Twixt Stakes is an American Thoroughbred horse race held annually in November at Laurel Park Racecourse in Laurel, Maryland. It is a restricted stakes race open to Maryland-bred fillies three years old and up and is run at seven furlongs on the dirt.

An ungraded stakes race, it offers a purse of $75,000 as of 2017. The race was named in honor of the filly Twixt, a Maryland-bred Champion each year that she raced, from 1972 through 1975. She was owned by Mr. and Mrs. John Merryman and Mrs. John M. Franklin. When she retired, she had recorded the largest career earnings level of any Maryland-bred mare at $699,143. She was Maryland-bred "Horse-of-the-Year" in 1973 and 1974. Twixt started in 71 races, and her 18 stakes wins (including the Barbara Fritchie Handicap twice) were also a Maryland-bred record when she retired. Twixt was born in 1969 out of the Restless Native mare Quarter Deck, who was bred by the Merrymans. She was trained by the Merrymans' daughter, Katherine (Katy) Merryman Voss.

Records 

Speed record: 
 1 mile - 1:37.00 - Les Ry Leigh (2006) 
  miles - 1:43.40 - Blue Sky Princess (1995)  
  miles - 1:48.40 - Valay Maid (1990), River Cruise (2003)

Most wins by a jockey:
 4 - Mario Pino (1987, 1995, 1996, 1999)

Most wins by a trainer:
 4 - Richard W. Small (1992, 1993, 2004, 2008)

Winners

See also 
 Twixt Stakes top three finishers and starters
 Laurel Park Racecourse

References

External links
 Laurel Park website

1978 establishments in Maryland
Laurel Park Racecourse
Horse races in Maryland
Recurring sporting events established in 1978